SN 2006X was a Type Ia supernova about 65 million light-years away in Messier 100, a spiral galaxy in the constellation  Coma Berenices.  The supernova was independently discovered in early February 2006 by Shoji Suzuki of Japan and Marco Migliardi of Italy.

SN 2006X is particularly significant because it is a Type Ia supernova.  These supernovae are used for measuring distances, so observations of these supernovae in nearby galaxies are needed for calibration. SN 2006X is located in a well-studied galaxy, and it was discovered two weeks before its peak brightness, so it may be extraordinarily useful for understanding supernovae and for calibrating supernovae for distance measurements.  It may even be possible to identify the progenitor of this supernova.

References

External links
 Light curves and spectra  on the Open Supernova Catalog
 Supernova 2006X in M100
 Brightness measures for SN 2006X
 NASA page with images of SN 2006X
 Large collection of SN 2006X images

Messier 100
Supernovae
Coma Berenices
20060204